Jasmin Grabowski née Külbs (born 7 November 1991) is a German judoka. She competed at the 2016 Summer Olympics in Rio de Janeiro, in the women's +78 kg. She was defeated by Ksenia Chibisova of Russia in the first round.

In 2021, she competed in the women's +78 kg event at the 2021 World Judo Championships held in Budapest, Hungary. She also competed in the women's +78 kg event at the 2020 Summer Olympics in Tokyo, Japan.

She is openly lesbian.

References

External links
 
 
 

1991 births
Living people
German female judoka
Olympic judoka of Germany
Judoka at the 2016 Summer Olympics
Judoka at the 2015 European Games
Judoka at the 2019 European Games
European Games medalists in judo
European Games silver medalists for Germany
Judoka at the 2020 Summer Olympics
German LGBT sportspeople
Medalists at the 2020 Summer Olympics
Olympic medalists in judo
Olympic bronze medalists for Germany
21st-century German women